The Lavochkin La-126 was a World War II Soviet prototype piston-engined fighter aircraft.

Development
Despite its superb performance, the Lavochkin La-7 fighter had a major drawback—much of its airframe was made of wood. In addition to being heavier than metal, the wooden structure was prone to rotting and warping when exposed to the elements, which at times, led to nasty surprises during flight and could ground entire squadrons. The solution was to create an all-metal airframe. In 1944, a La-7 was successfully tested with 23 mm Nudelman-Suranov NS-23 cannon. At the same time, the La-7L was tested with a new laminar flow wing by TsAGI, and another La-7 was tested with the new Shvetsov ASh-83 motor. While only slightly more powerful than a Shvetsov ASh-82FN, the ASh-83 had much better performance at high altitude. All of these developments were combined in the new La-120 prototype with mostly metal construction, NS-23 cannon, laminar flow wing, and ASh-83 engine. Flight testing began in January 1945, with the aircraft reaching a top speed of 735 km/h (457 mph). However, the ASh-83 engine proved unreliable and La-120 development was stopped after two prototypes.

The La-120 design directly evolved into La-126. The aircraft was equipped with the proven ASh-82FN engine and the laminar flow wing was perfected, eliminating the need for leading-edge slats. This was a welcome change as the slats on La-7 had a tendency for unsynchronized deployment, with a serious impact on aircraft handling. Flight testing of the La-126 was completed by 1946 with somewhat disappointing results. While the armament of four 23 mm NS-23 cannon represented a leap over the La-7 with three 20 mm Berezin B-20 (projectile mass from a one-second burst had increased from 3.1 kg (6.8 lb) on La-7 to 6 kg (13.2 lb) on La-126), there was no significant improvement in performance. As a result, the La-126 never advanced beyond the prototype stage. The concept of an all-metal La-7 was finally realized with the Lavochkin La-9.

Specifications (La-126)

See also

References
Notes

Bibliography

 Gordon, Yefim. Lavochkin's Piston-Engined Fighters (Red Star Volume 10). Earl Shilton, Leicester, UK: Midland Publishing Ltd., 2003. .
 Kopenhagen, W (ed.), Das große Flugzeug-Typenbuch (in German). Transpress, 1987, 

Low-wing aircraft
1940s Soviet fighter aircraft
La-126
Single-engined tractor aircraft